The Chinese Taipei women's national baseball team is a national team of Chinese Taipei (Taiwan) and is governed by the Chinese Taipei Baseball Association. It represents the nation in women's international competition. The team is a member of the Baseball Federation of Asia, and currently world number two in the WBSC World Rankings.

Tournament record

Women's Baseball Asian Cup

Women's Baseball World Cup

Uniform

See also
Chinese Taipei national baseball team
Chinese Taipei Baseball Association

References

External links
 Official website 
 Taiwan women's baseball advocate associate 

Women's national baseball teams
B